The Roman Catholic Diocese of Luziânia is a diocese in the Ecclesiastical province of the Metropolitan of Brasília in Brazil.

Its cathedral episcopal see is Catedral Nossa Senhora da Evangelização, dedicated to Our Lady of Evangelization, located in the city of Luziânia, Goiás state.

History 
 Established on 29 March 1989 as Diocese of Luziânia, on territories split off from the Diocese of Anápolis, Diocese of Ipameri and Diocese of Uruaçu

Statistics 
As per 2015 it pastorally served 639,000 Catholics (78.3% of 815,600 total) on 16,424 km² in 32 parishes and 2 missions with 57 priests (30 diocesan, 27 religious), 4 deacons, 101 lay religious (62 brothers, 39 sisters) and 13 seminarians .

Bishops
(all Roman rite)

Episcopal Ordinaries
Suffragan Bishops of Luziânia 
 Agostinho Januszewicz, O.F.M. Conv. (born Poland) (1989.03.29 – retired 2004.09.15), died 2011
 Auxiliary Bishop: José Carlos dos Santos, F.D.P. (2001.06.20 – 2002.03.25)
 Afonso Fioreze, C.P. (2004.09.15 – retired 2017.07.12), succeeded as a Coadjutor Bishop of Luziânia (2003.11.05 – 2004.09.15)
 Waldemar Passini Dalbello (2017.07.12 - ...); previously Titular Bishop of Membressa (2009.12.30 – 2014.12.03) as Auxiliary Bishop of Archdiocese of Goiania (Brazil) (2009.12.30 – 2014.12.03)and Apostolic Administrator of Archdiocese of Brasília (Brazil) (2011.02.17 – 2011.06.15), Coadjutor Bishop of Luziânia (2014.12.03 – succession 2017.07.12).

Coadjutor bishops
Afonso Fioreze, C.P. (2003-2004)
Waldemar Passini Dalbello (2014-2017)

Auxiliary bishops
José Carlos dos Santos, F.D.P. (2001-2002)

See also 
 List of Catholic dioceses in Brazil

Sources and external links 
 GCatholic.org, with Google satellite photo - data for al sections
 Diocesan website (in Portuguese)
 Catholic Hierarchy

Roman Catholic dioceses in Brazil
Religious organizations established in 1989
Roman Catholic Ecclesiastical Province of Brasília
Roman Catholic dioceses and prelatures established in the 20th century